María Luisa Elío Bernal (17 August 1926 – 17 July 2009) was a Spanish writer and actress exiled in Mexico. She was an inspiration for Gabriel García Márquez. She wrote and acted in an autobiographical film, El balcón vacío (The Empty Balcony), which was one of the first films to depict the life of Spanish exiles during the Spanish Civil War.

Biography
Born in Pamplona on 17 August 1926, María Luisa was the third and last daughter of Luis Elío Torres and Carmen Bernal López de Lago, who had married in 1920.

Her father, a lawyer and judge, suffered for his left-wing tendencies during the Spanish Civil War and was imprisoned, but managed to escape. In late 1939 he was smuggled to the border, and after a brief time in the Gurs concentration camp, he made his way to Paris and was reunited with his family.

On February 16, 1940, they departed for Mexico. María Luisa, an intelligent, glamorous woman, studied drama, became involved in cultural and literary circles and married Jomí García Ascot, also the child of exiles, in 1952.

After arriving in Mexico, Elío began studying drama with Seki Sano, a Japanese exile living in Mexico. She was a member of the group Poetry Out Loud and published poetry works in newspapers and magazines. She also wrote short stories, screenplays and performed on Mexican television.

In 1960, her husband was invited to go to Cuba and participate in a film, Cuba 58 being filmed there. Originally five segments were planned for the film, but the final composition contains only three, two of which were created by García Ascot. García planned a new project, a musical comedy in the style of West Side Story, but had to abandon the project as the political situation in Cuba deteriorated. The couple returned to Mexico and began working in a collaboration with Emilio García Riera to produce one of the first films about Spanish exiles. The film, El balcón vacío (The Empty Balcony) is Elío's autobiographical story and she wrote the script of the film. She also acted in the film. Shooting only on weekends because the trio all had regular jobs, the film took a year to produce and was not a commercial success, though it did win awards.

Elío and her husband were personal friends of the writer Gabriel García Márquez and his masterwork, One Hundred Years of Solitude was dedicated to them with the inscription, “Para (to) Jomí García Ascot y María Luisa Elío”. In the eighteen months that he took to write the book, they went to his house every night and critiqued the versions of the story as it developed.

In 1968, Elío and García Ascot divorced. In 1970, she took their son Diego (born 1963) with her and made her first return trip to Spain. She wrote a book, Tiempo de llorar (Time to Weep) in 1988 about the bittersweet return and the breakdown she had as a result. A second book, Cuaderno de apuntes en carne viva (Notebook in Living Flesh) published in 1995, attempted to explore the journey of putting her broken pieces back together. Those who came as children from Spain as exiles to Mexico, called themselves The Nepantla Generation, a Nahuatl word which describes the state of belonging to two places at the same time. Neither of one, nor the other. Elío described herself as being caught between past and present which hampered her ability to see the future.

Elío died in Coyoacán, Mexico City, on 17 July 2009.

Awards
In 2007, the Spanish Government decorated María Luisa Elio Bernal with the Officer's Cross of the Order of Isabella the Catholic for her services to Spain.

Selected works
Tiempo de llorar, México, El Equilibrista, 1988.
Cuaderno de apuntes en carne viva, México, El Equilibrista, 1995.
Tiempo de llorar y otros relatos, Madrid, Turner, 2002.

Filmography
No matarás (1943)
Girls Boarding School (1943)
La guerra de los pasteles (1944)
El jagüey de las ruinas (1945)
En el balcón vacío (1961)
Remedios Varo (1967) Narrator (voice)

References

Literature

External links

1926 births
2009 deaths
Spanish women writers
Mexican women writers
People from Pamplona
Exiles of the Spanish Civil War in Mexico
Spanish actresses
Recipients of the Order of Isabella the Catholic
Exiles of the Spanish Civil War in Cuba
Exiles of the Spanish Civil War in France
20th-century Spanish women